Cash flow matching is a process of hedging in which a company or other entity matches its cash outflows (i.e., financial obligations) with its cash inflows over a given time horizon. It is a subset of immunization strategies in finance. Cash flow matching is of particular importance to defined benefit pension plans.

Solution with linear programming
It is possible to solve the simple cash flow matching problem using linear programming. Suppose that we have a choice of  bonds with which to receive cash flows over  time periods in order to cover liabilities  for each time period. The th bond in time period  is assumed to have known cash flows  and initial price . Therefore, a more realistic approach to cash flow matching is to employ mixed-integer linear programming to select a discrete number of instruments with which to match liabilities.

See also
Cash flow hedging
Debt sculpting
Duration gap
Dedicated portfolio theory
Fannie Mae
Immunization (finance)

References

Cash flow
Corporate finance
Derivatives (finance)
Financial risk management
Linear programming